Grant Ginder (born 1982/1983) is an American novelist, academic, and former political aide.

Background and education
Ginder grew up in Laguna Beach, California. He received a bachelor of arts from the University of Pennsylvania and a master of fine arts from New York University. At the latter, Ginder studied under novelists Junot Diaz and Colson Whitehead.

Career
While in college, Ginder worked as an intern in the offices of U.S. Representative Loretta Sanchez. Upon completing his education, Ginder served as a speechwriter for John Podesta at the Center for American Progress.  In 2009, he published his first novel, This is How it Starts, a story of young government employees and interns working in Washington, D.C. Politico called the novel an examination of Washington's "power elite" -- "sharply observed" and "packed with sly humor."

In 2013, Ginder published the novel Driver's Education. In a starred review, the industry publication Booklist called the book, "lively, funny, gritty, and achingly real," comparing Ginder to novelists Junot Diaz and Michael Chabon. In The Boston Globe, critic Karen Campbell called the work "engaging, colorful, direct, and imaginative," and "a stirring, memorable trip." The New Yorker magazine called the work "a sensitively observed story," about "lessons that bear repeating." , Ginder lives in Brooklyn, and teaches writing at New York University, his alma mater.

Novels

References

External links

1980s births
21st-century American male writers
21st-century American novelists
Center for American Progress people
Living people
New York University alumni
New York University faculty
Novelists from California
People from Laguna Beach, California
Place of birth missing (living people)
University of Pennsylvania alumni
Writers from Brooklyn
Year of birth missing (living people)